John Oates (born 1948), is an American musician, best known as half of the rock and soul duo Hall & Oates.

John Oates  may also refer to:

John Oates (architect) (1793–1831), British architect
Johnny Oates (1946–2004), baseball manager

See also
John Oates Bower (1901–1981), Canadian politician
Jonny Oates, Baron Oates (born 1969), English politician